The 2003–04 Boston Bruins season was the team's 80th season of operation in the National Hockey League (NHL).

Off-season
Mike Sullivan was named the team’s new head coach on June 23, 2003.

Regular season
The Bruins had the fewest power-play opportunities of any team in the League, with just 300.

Final standings

Playoffs

Schedule and results

Regular season

|- align="center" 
|1||T||October 8, 2003||3–3 OT|| align="left"|  New Jersey Devils (2003–04) ||0–0–1–0 || 
|- align="center" bgcolor="#FFBBBB"
|2||L||October 10, 2003||1–5 || align="left"| @ Tampa Bay Lightning (2003–04) ||0–1–1–0 || 
|- align="center" 
|3||T||October 11, 2003||1–1 OT|| align="left"| @ Florida Panthers (2003–04) ||0–1–2–0 || 
|- align="center" bgcolor="#CCFFCC" 
|4||W||October 15, 2003||2–0 || align="left"| @ Dallas Stars (2003–04) ||1–1–2–0 || 
|- align="center" bgcolor="#CCFFCC" 
|5||W||October 18, 2003||4–3 || align="left"| @ Los Angeles Kings (2003–04) ||2–1–2–0 || 
|- align="center" bgcolor="#CCFFCC" 
|6||W||October 19, 2003||4–3 OT|| align="left"| @ Mighty Ducks of Anaheim (2003–04) ||3–1–2–0 || 
|- align="center" bgcolor="#CCFFCC" 
|7||W||October 21, 2003||4–1 || align="left"| @ Colorado Avalanche (2003–04) ||4–1–2–0 || 
|- align="center" bgcolor="#FFBBBB"
|8||L||October 23, 2003||0–2 || align="left"|  Carolina Hurricanes (2003–04) ||4–2–2–0 || 
|- align="center" bgcolor="#CCFFCC" 
|9||W||October 25, 2003||5–2 || align="left"| @ New Jersey Devils (2003–04) ||5–2–2–0 || 
|- align="center" bgcolor="#CCFFCC" 
|10||W||October 28, 2003||2–0 || align="left"| @ Montreal Canadiens (2003–04) ||6–2–2–0 || 
|- align="center" bgcolor="#FF6F6F"
|11||OTL||October 30, 2003||0–1 OT|| align="left"|  Montreal Canadiens (2003–04) ||6–2–2–1 || 
|-

|- align="center" bgcolor="#FF6F6F"
|12||OTL||November 1, 2003||2–3 OT|| align="left"| @ Pittsburgh Penguins (2003–04) ||6–2–2–2 || 
|- align="center" 
|13||T||November 6, 2003||5–5 OT|| align="left"|  San Jose Sharks (2003–04) ||6–2–3–2 || 
|- align="center" bgcolor="#CCFFCC" 
|14||W||November 8, 2003||4–1 || align="left"|  Dallas Stars (2003–04) ||7–2–3–2 || 
|- align="center" bgcolor="#CCFFCC" 
|15||W||November 11, 2003||4–3 || align="left"|  Edmonton Oilers (2003–04) ||8–2–3–2 || 
|- align="center" bgcolor="#CCFFCC" 
|16||W||November 14, 2003||4–0 || align="left"| @ Columbus Blue Jackets (2003–04) ||9–2–3–2 || 
|- align="center" bgcolor="#CCFFCC" 
|17||W||November 15, 2003||2–1 OT|| align="left"|  Vancouver Canucks (2003–04) ||10–2–3–2 || 
|- align="center" bgcolor="#FF6F6F"
|18||OTL||November 19, 2003||4–5 OT|| align="left"| @ Atlanta Thrashers (2003–04) ||10–2–3–3 || 
|- align="center" bgcolor="#CCFFCC" 
|19||W||November 20, 2003||3–2 || align="left"|  Washington Capitals (2003–04) ||11–2–3–3 || 
|- align="center" bgcolor="#FFBBBB"
|20||L||November 22, 2003||2–3 || align="left"| @ Philadelphia Flyers (2003–04) ||11–3–3–3 || 
|- align="center" bgcolor="#FF6F6F"
|21||OTL||November 25, 2003||3–4 OT|| align="left"| @ St. Louis Blues (2003–04) ||11–3–3–4 || 
|- align="center" bgcolor="#FFBBBB"
|22||L||November 28, 2003||1–2 || align="left"|  Nashville Predators (2003–04) ||11–4–3–4 || 
|- align="center" 
|23||T||November 30, 2003||3–3 OT|| align="left"|  Phoenix Coyotes (2003–04) ||11–4–4–4 || 
|-

|- align="center" bgcolor="#CCFFCC" 
|24||W||December 3, 2003||6–4 || align="left"| @ Atlanta Thrashers (2003–04) ||12–4–4–4 || 
|- align="center" bgcolor="#FFBBBB"
|25||L||December 4, 2003||0–6 || align="left"|  Toronto Maple Leafs (2003–04) ||12–5–4–4 || 
|- align="center" 
|26||T||December 6, 2003||1–1 OT|| align="left"|  Philadelphia Flyers (2003–04) ||12–5–5–4 || 
|- align="center" 
|27||T||December 8, 2003||2–2 OT|| align="left"|  Ottawa Senators (2003–04) ||12–5–6–4 || 
|- align="center" 
|28||T||December 10, 2003||1–1 OT|| align="left"| @ Florida Panthers (2003–04) ||12–5–7–4 || 
|- align="center" bgcolor="#FFBBBB"
|29||L||December 11, 2003||5–6 || align="left"| @ Washington Capitals (2003–04) ||12–6–7–4 || 
|- align="center" bgcolor="#CCFFCC" 
|30||W||December 13, 2003||3–2 || align="left"| @ Ottawa Senators (2003–04) ||13–6–7–4 || 
|- align="center" 
|31||T||December 16, 2003||1–1 OT|| align="left"| @ Montreal Canadiens (2003–04) ||13–6–8–4 || 
|- align="center" bgcolor="#FFBBBB"
|32||L||December 18, 2003||0–5 || align="left"|  Calgary Flames (2003–04) ||13–7–8–4 || 
|- align="center" bgcolor="#FFBBBB"
|33||L||December 20, 2003||1–2 || align="left"|  Carolina Hurricanes (2003–04) ||13–8–8–4 || 
|- align="center" bgcolor="#FFBBBB"
|34||L||December 22, 2003||2–4 || align="left"| @ New York Rangers (2003–04) ||13–9–8–4 || 
|- align="center" 
|35||T||December 23, 2003||1–1 OT|| align="left"|  Tampa Bay Lightning (2003–04) ||13–9–9–4 || 
|- align="center" bgcolor="#FFBBBB"
|36||L||December 27, 2003||2–4 || align="left"| @ Tampa Bay Lightning (2003–04) ||13–10–9–4 || 
|- align="center" bgcolor="#CCFFCC" 
|37||W||December 29, 2003||3–1 || align="left"| @ Washington Capitals (2003–04) ||14–10–9–4 || 
|- align="center" bgcolor="#FFBBBB"
|38||L||December 30, 2003||0–3 || align="left"|  Ottawa Senators (2003–04) ||14–11–9–4 || 
|-

|- align="center" bgcolor="#CCFFCC" 
|39||W||January 1, 2004||3–2 || align="left"|  Toronto Maple Leafs (2003–04) ||15–11–9–4 || 
|- align="center" 
|40||T||January 3, 2004||3–3 OT|| align="left"|  New York Islanders (2003–04) ||15–11–10–4 || 
|- align="center" bgcolor="#CCFFCC" 
|41||W||January 7, 2004||3–0 || align="left"| @ Detroit Red Wings (2003–04) ||16–11–10–4 || 
|- align="center" bgcolor="#CCFFCC" 
|42||W||January 8, 2004||3–1 || align="left"|  Pittsburgh Penguins (2003–04) ||17–11–10–4 || 
|- align="center" bgcolor="#CCFFCC" 
|43||W||January 10, 2004||2–1 OT|| align="left"|  Detroit Red Wings (2003–04) ||18–11–10–4 || 
|- align="center" bgcolor="#CCFFCC" 
|44||W||January 12, 2004||4–3 || align="left"|  Buffalo Sabres (2003–04) ||19–11–10–4 || 
|- align="center" bgcolor="#CCFFCC" 
|45||W||January 15, 2004||1–0 || align="left"| @ Buffalo Sabres (2003–04) ||20–11–10–4 || 
|- align="center" bgcolor="#FFBBBB"
|46||L||January 17, 2004||0–4 || align="left"| @ Ottawa Senators (2003–04) ||20–12–10–4 || 
|- align="center" bgcolor="#CCFFCC" 
|47||W||January 19, 2004||5–2 || align="left"|  New York Rangers (2003–04) ||21–12–10–4 || 
|- align="center" bgcolor="#CCFFCC" 
|48||W||January 20, 2004||4–1 || align="left"| @ New York Rangers (2003–04) ||22–12–10–4 || 
|- align="center" bgcolor="#FFBBBB"
|49||L||January 22, 2004||2–3 || align="left"|  Buffalo Sabres (2003–04) ||22–13–10–4 || 
|- align="center" bgcolor="#FFBBBB"
|50||L||January 24, 2004||1–2 || align="left"|  Florida Panthers (2003–04) ||22–14–10–4 || 
|- align="center" 
|51||T||January 27, 2004||2–2 OT|| align="left"| @ New York Islanders (2003–04) ||22–14–11–4 || 
|- align="center" bgcolor="#CCFFCC" 
|52||W||January 29, 2004||2–1 OT|| align="left"|  New York Islanders (2003–04) ||23–14–11–4 || 
|- align="center" bgcolor="#CCFFCC" 
|53||W||January 31, 2004||1–0 || align="left"| @ Montreal Canadiens (2003–04) ||24–14–11–4 || 
|-

|- align="center" bgcolor="#CCFFCC" 
|54||W||February 1, 2004||4–1 || align="left"|  Pittsburgh Penguins (2003–04) ||25–14–11–4 || 
|- align="center" bgcolor="#CCFFCC" 
|55||W||February 3, 2004||5–4 || align="left"|  Atlanta Thrashers (2003–04) ||26–14–11–4 || 
|- align="center" bgcolor="#CCFFCC" 
|56||W||February 5, 2004||6–2 || align="left"| @ Buffalo Sabres (2003–04) ||27–14–11–4 || 
|- align="center" bgcolor="#CCFFCC" 
|57||W||February 10, 2004||6–3 || align="left"| @ Pittsburgh Penguins (2003–04) ||28–14–11–4 || 
|- align="center" bgcolor="#FF6F6F"
|58||OTL||February 12, 2004||2–3 OT|| align="left"| @ Ottawa Senators (2003–04) ||28–14–11–5 || 
|- align="center" bgcolor="#FF6F6F"
|59||OTL||February 14, 2004||1–2 OT|| align="left"| @ Chicago Blackhawks (2003–04) ||28–14–11–6 || 
|- align="center" bgcolor="#CCFFCC" 
|60||W||February 17, 2004||5–2 || align="left"| @ Toronto Maple Leafs (2003–04) ||29–14–11–6 || 
|- align="center" bgcolor="#CCFFCC" 
|61||W||February 19, 2004||4–3 || align="left"| @ Philadelphia Flyers (2003–04) ||30–14–11–6 || 
|- align="center" 
|62||T||February 21, 2004||3–3 OT|| align="left"| @ Carolina Hurricanes (2003–04) ||30–14–12–6 || 
|- align="center" bgcolor="#FFBBBB"
|63||L||February 23, 2004||0–2 || align="left"|  Florida Panthers (2003–04) ||30–15–12–6 || 
|- align="center" 
|64||T||February 24, 2004||0–0 OT|| align="left"| @ New York Islanders (2003–04) ||30–15–13–6 || 
|- align="center" bgcolor="#FF6F6F"
|65||OTL||February 26, 2004||2–3 OT|| align="left"|  Montreal Canadiens (2003–04) ||30–15–13–7 || 
|- align="center" bgcolor="#CCFFCC" 
|66||W||February 28, 2004||3–2 OT|| align="left"|  Philadelphia Flyers (2003–04) ||31–15–13–7 || 
|-

|- align="center" bgcolor="#FFBBBB"
|67||L||March 2, 2004||2–3 || align="left"| @ Toronto Maple Leafs (2003–04) ||31–16–13–7 || 
|- align="center" bgcolor="#CCFFCC" 
|68||W||March 4, 2004||3–1 || align="left"|  New York Rangers (2003–04) ||32–16–13–7 || 
|- align="center" 
|69||T||March 6, 2004||2–2 OT|| align="left"|  Atlanta Thrashers (2003–04) ||32–16–14–7 || 
|- align="center" bgcolor="#CCFFCC" 
|70||W||March 9, 2004||3–2 || align="left"| @ Nashville Predators (2003–04) ||33–16–14–7 || 
|- align="center" bgcolor="#CCFFCC" 
|71||W||March 11, 2004||3–2 OT|| align="left"| @ Buffalo Sabres (2003–04) ||34–16–14–7 || 
|- align="center" bgcolor="#CCFFCC" 
|72||W||March 13, 2004||3–2 OT|| align="left"|  Buffalo Sabres (2003–04) ||35–16–14–7 || 
|- align="center" bgcolor="#CCFFCC" 
|73||W||March 16, 2004||2–1 || align="left"| @ Toronto Maple Leafs (2003–04) ||36–16–14–7 || 
|- align="center" bgcolor="#FFBBBB"
|74||L||March 18, 2004||0–2 || align="left"|  Minnesota Wild (2003–04) ||36–17–14–7 || 
|- align="center" bgcolor="#CCFFCC" 
|75||W||March 20, 2004||5–4 || align="left"|  Tampa Bay Lightning (2003–04) ||37–17–14–7 || 
|- align="center" bgcolor="#CCFFCC" 
|76||W||March 23, 2004||4–2 || align="left"|  Ottawa Senators (2003–04) ||38–17–14–7 || 
|- align="center" bgcolor="#FFBBBB"
|77||L||March 25, 2004||0–3 || align="left"|  Toronto Maple Leafs (2003–04) ||38–18–14–7 || 
|- align="center" bgcolor="#CCFFCC" 
|78||W||March 27, 2004||3–2 OT|| align="left"|  Montreal Canadiens (2003–04) ||39–18–14–7 || 
|- align="center" bgcolor="#CCFFCC" 
|79||W||March 30, 2004||3–2 || align="left"| @ Carolina Hurricanes (2003–04) ||40–18–14–7 || 
|-

|- align="center" 
|80||T||April 1, 2004||3–3 OT|| align="left"|  Washington Capitals (2003–04) ||40–18–15–7 || 
|- align="center" bgcolor="#FFBBBB"
|81||L||April 3, 2004||2–5 || align="left"|  New Jersey Devils (2003–04) ||40–19–15–7 || 
|- align="center" bgcolor="#CCFFCC" 
|82||W||April 4, 2004||3–1 || align="left"| @ New Jersey Devils (2003–04) ||41–19–15–7 || 
|-

|-
| Legend:

Playoffs

|-  style="text-align:center; background:#CCFFCC;"
| 1 || April 7 || Montreal || 3–0 || Boston || || Raycroft || 17,565 || Boston leads 1–0 || 
|-  style="text-align:center; background:#CCFFCC;"
| 2 || April 9 || Montreal || 2–1 || Boston || OT || Raycroft || 17,565 || Boston leads 2–0 || 
|-  style="text-align:center; background:#FFBBBB;"
| 3 || April 11 || Boston || 3–2 || Montreal || || Theodore || 21,273 || Boston leads 2–1 || 
|-  style="text-align:center; background:#CCFFCC;"
| 4 || April 13 || Boston || 3–4 || Montreal || OT || Raycroft || 21,273 || Boston leads 3–1 || 
|-  style="text-align:center; background:#FFBBBB;"
| 5 || April 15 || Montreal || 1–5 || Boston || || Theodore || 17,565 || Boston leads 3–2 || 
|-  style="text-align:center; background:#FFBBBB;"
| 6 || April 17 || Boston || 2–5 || Montreal || || Theodore || 21,273 || Series tied 3–3 || 
|-  style="text-align:center; background:#FFBBBB;"
| 7 || April 19 || Montreal || 2–0 || Boston || || Theodore || 17,565 || Montreal wins 4–3 || 
|-

|-
| Legend:

Player statistics

Scoring
 Position abbreviations: C = Center; D = Defense; G = Goaltender; LW = Left Wing; RW = Right Wing
  = Joined team via a transaction (e.g., trade, waivers, signing) during the season. Stats reflect time with the Bruins only.
  = Left team via a transaction (e.g., trade, waivers, release) during the season. Stats reflect time with the Bruins only.

Goaltending

Awards and records

Awards

Transactions
The Bruins were involved in the following transactions from June 10, 2003, the day after the deciding game of the 2003 Stanley Cup Finals, through June 7, 2004, the day of the deciding game of the 2004 Stanley Cup Finals.

Trades

Players acquired

Players lost

Signings

Draft picks
Boston's draft picks at the 2003 NHL Entry Draft held at the Gaylord Entertainment Center in Nashville, Tennessee.

See also
2003–04 NHL season

Notes

References

 
 

Boston Bruins
Boston Bruins
Boston Bruins seasons
Boston Bruins
Boston Bruins
Bruins
Bruins